The 2019–20 season was Stal Stalowa Wola's tenth consecutive season in II liga since relegation from I liga in 2010. In addition to the domestic league, Stal participated in this season's edition of the Polish Cup. The season was slated to cover a period from 27 July 2019 to 30 May 2020. It was extended extraordinarily beyond 30 June due to the COVID-19 pandemic in Poland. In the end, Stal got relegated to III liga in spite of seven wins in the league at the last season's eleven games. The bad start and last matchday's defeat at Pogoń Siedlce confirmed the relegation.

Players

Transfers

In

Out

Pre-season and friendlies

Competitions

Overview

II liga

Standings

Results summary

Matches

Polish Cup

Statistics

Top scorers

II liga
 10 goals –  Michał Fidziukiewicz
 8 goals –  Kacper Śpiewak 
 7 goals –  Robert Dadok 
 3 goals –  Bartłomiej Ciepiela
 2 goals –  Szymon Jarosz,  Piotr Mroziński,  Michał Płonka,  Bartosz Sobotka 
 1 goal –  Dominik Chromiński,  Krzysztof Kiercz,  Michał Mistrzyk,  Przemysław Stelmach,  Adam Waszkiewicz,  Filip Wójcik,  Łukasz Zjawiński

Polish Cup
 2 goals –  Michał Fidziukiewicz 
 1 goal –  Bartłomiej Ciepiela,  Krzysztof Kiercz,  Rafał Michalik

Notes

References

Stal Stalowa Wola seasons
Stal Stalowa Wola